Thomas Moynihan (27 February 1921 – 12 December 1988) was a New Zealand cricketer. He played in five first-class matches for Canterbury from 1940 to 1953.

See also
 List of Canterbury representative cricketers

References

External links
 

1921 births
1988 deaths
New Zealand cricketers
Canterbury cricketers
People from Kaikōura
Cricketers from Canterbury, New Zealand